Francesca Gallina (born 24 November 1996) is an Italian snowboarder. She competed at the 2022 Winter Olympics, in  Women's snowboard cross.

She competed at the 2018–19 FIS Freestyle Ski World Cup, 2019–20 FIS Freestyle Ski World Cup, 2020–21 FIS Freestyle Ski World Cup, and 2021–22 FIS Freestyle Ski World Cup.

References 

Living people
1996 births
Italian female snowboarders
Olympic snowboarders of Italy
Snowboarders at the 2022 Winter Olympics
People from Magenta, Lombardy
Sportspeople from the Metropolitan City of Milan
21st-century Italian women